George Stewart Brown (August 16, 1871 – November 11, 1941) was a judge of the United States Customs Court and a member of the Board of General Appraisers.

Education and career

Born on August 16, 1871, in Baltimore, Maryland, Brown received an Artium Baccalaureus degree in 1893 from Johns Hopkins University. He received a Bachelor of Laws in 1895 from the University of Maryland School of Law. He worked in private practice in Baltimore from 1895 to 1913. He served as a member of the Baltimore City Council from 1899 to 1907.

Federal Judicial Service

Brown was nominated by President Woodrow Wilson on October 16, 1913, to a seat on the Board of General Appraisers vacated by Roy Chamberlain. He was confirmed by the United States Senate on November 13, 1913, and received his commission on November 14, 1913. Brown was reassigned by operation of law to the United States Customs Court on May 28, 1926, to a new Associate Justice seat (Judge seat from June 17, 1930) authorized by 44 Stat. 669. He served as Presiding Judge from 1939 to 1940. His service terminated on August 31, 1941, due to his retirement. He was succeeded by Judge William Purington Cole Jr.

Death

Brown died on November 11, 1941, in Baltimore.

References

Sources
 

1871 births
1941 deaths
Judges of the United States Customs Court
Lawyers from Baltimore
Johns Hopkins University alumni
University of Maryland Francis King Carey School of Law alumni
Members of the Board of General Appraisers
United States Article I federal judges appointed by Woodrow Wilson
20th-century American judges